Lophophine (MMDPEA or 3-methoxy-4,5-methylenedioxyphenethylamine) is a putative psychedelic and entactogen drug of the methylenedioxyphenethylamine class. It is the α-demethylated homologue of MMDA, and is also closely related to mescaline.

Alexander Shulgin originally suggested that lophophine may be a natural constituent of peyote (Lophophora williamsii) due to it being the only logical chemical intermediate for the biosynthesis of several tetrahydroisoquinolines known to be present in this cactus species. Subsequently, lophophine was indeed shown to be a minor component of both peyote and San Pedro cactus.

Shulgin reports that lophophine is active in the dosage range of 150–250 mg. He states that at these doses, lophophine has some similarity to mescaline in action, in producing a peaceful elevation of mood, euphoria, and mild enhancement of visual perception, but without the generation of closed-eye mental imagery. Shulgin also notes that (in contrast to mescaline), lophophine causes no nausea.

See also 
 MDPEA

References

External links 
 PiHKAL: #95 Lophophine: 3-Methoxy-4,5-methylenedioxyphenethylamine
 Mescaline: The Chemistry and Pharmacology of its Analogues

Benzodioxoles
Phenethylamines
Phenol ethers
Psychedelic phenethylamines
Serotonin receptor agonists
Phenethylamine alkaloids